Lirabotys is a genus of moths of the family Crambidae.

Species
Lirabotys liralis (Legrand, 1966)
Lirabotys prolausalis (Walker, 1859)
Lirabotys rufitincta (Hampson, 1913)

References

Pyraustinae
Crambidae genera
Taxa named by Eugene G. Munroe